Chromatothrips is a genus of thrips in the family Phlaeothripidae.

Species
 Chromatothrips annulicornis
 Chromatothrips fasciatus
 Chromatothrips plantaginis

References

Phlaeothripidae
Thrips
Thrips genera